The following is a list of Teen Choice Award winners and nominees for the Choice TV Actor – Drama award, which was formerly known as the Choice TV Actor – Action/Drama award.

Winners and nominees

1990s

2000s

2010s

References

Drama Actor